Meninx (Mē̂ninx) is a Tunisian archaeological site located on the southeastern coast of the island of Djerba, near the present city of Henchir El Kantara. The theater is at 33.688° N, 10.925° E. 

It was originally a trading post founded by the Phoenicians but reached its apogee in Roman times, when it became the chief town of the island, which was also called Meninx at the time. Meninx town was a major producer of priceless murex dye, and is cited by Pliny the Elder as second only to Tyre in this regard.

The first archaeologists to investigate the site highlighted thermal baths, an amphitheater, a theater, a basilica and probably a forum. Moreover, the ground was strewn with vestiges, such as bases of white marble columns, granite columns, capitals as well as numerous statues. In 1942, excavations were carried out by Paul-Marie Duval, and the site started to be thoroughly investigated in 2017.

References

Communes of Tunisia
Populated places in Béja Governorate
Cities in Tunisia
Catholic titular sees in Africa
Former Roman Catholic dioceses in Africa
Phoenician colonies in Tunisia